Claudio Poppen (born August 4, 1974) is an Aruban football player who made a single appearance for the Aruba national team in 2002.

References

1974 births
Living people
Aruban footballers
Association football forwards
Aruba international footballers